Michael Müller (born 19 September 1984) is a German handballer who plays for Bundesliga club SG Flensburg-Handewitt and the German national team.

References

External links
 Michael Müller at the MT Melsungen website

1984 births
Living people
Sportspeople from Würzburg
German male handball players
HSG Wetzlar players
21st-century German people